Fiborgtangen is a peninsula and industrial site located along Trondheimsfjord in the northwest part of the village of Skogn in the municipality of Levanger in Trøndelag county, Norway.  The  site hosts the paper mill Norske Skog Skogn and the associated port used to ship newsprint away from the plant.  Fiborgtangen is also the site chosen by Industrikraft Midt-Norge to build a thermal power plant powered by natural gas.

The site is accessible via a side track from the Nordland Line and from European route E6, which both run past the site.

References

Levanger
Norske Skog
Ports and harbours of Norway
Industrial parks in Norway